"Amazon Women in the Mood" is the first episode in season three of Futurama. It originally aired on the Fox network in the United States on February 4, 2001.

Plot
Amy receives a phone call from someone who stammers and then hangs up. The calls are from Kif, who loves Amy but is too nervous to speak. Zapp realizes that Amy and Leela work together and asks them on a double date with him and Kif. Leela agrees as a favor to Amy, and they go to a restaurant aboard a space liner.

Kif offends Amy by using Zapp's boorish pick-up lines. Kif tries to salvage the evening by singing karaoke. Amy is touched, but Zapp pushes Kif off the stage and sings so poorly that passengers and crew flee the restaurant. Zapp crashes the ship into the planet Amazonia, where the Amazonians, a tribe of giant, muscular women, capture them.

Fry and Bender travel to Amazonia to rescue their friends but are also captured. Fry, Zapp, and Bender ridicule female values, which makes Leela and Amy appreciate how good life would be without men. When the Amazonians ask about the purpose of men, Amy explains, and the Amazonians realize she is describing "snu-snu" (sexual intercourse), something they have heard of but never experienced.

The Amazonians' leader, a giant computer called Femputer (Bea Arthur), decides to punish the men. Bender is spared for not possessing male anatomy, but Zapp, Fry, and Kif are sentenced to death by snu-snu. Kif is horrified, but Zapp and Fry are both eager and horrified. Kif tells Amy that he was the one who called her and that he loves her. Amy resolves to save him.

Zapp and Fry are snu-snued off-screen. Kif climbs to the ceiling and escapes from at least one of the Amazonians.  Later, both Zapp and Fry ask for the snu-snuing to stop because they are tired, but the Amazonians continue.

Leela and Amy convince Bender to reprogram the Femputer. He discovers that the Femputer is operated by a fembot, who created the Amazonian society because her home planet was extremely chauvinistic. Amy rescues Kif; the Amazonians chase after them, cornering them in the Femputer's chamber. By this time, however, Bender and the fembot have become romantic. They order the Amazonians to release their captives and bring gold.

The crew returns to Earth where Fry and Zapp receive treatment for crushed pelvises. Bender has a pile of gold bricks, and Kif and Amy are a couple. They all agree that Amazonia was their best mission ever.

Cultural references
The episode's title is a reference to the movie Amazon Women on the Moon. Zapp's rendition of "Lola" is a parody of William Shatner's attempt at "Rocket Man."  The bar "Le'Palm d'Orbit" is a reference to "Palme d'Or." Zapp calls himself "the Velour Fog" as a reference to Mel Torme's nickname, "the Velvet Fog".

Themes
The episode features what Science Fiction Weekly calls the "stereotypical women's fantasy"—a world without men, a theme featured often in science fiction. The cliché, unlike the opposite male fantasy of having a harem of women, represents the desire "not to be marginalized in one's own society".

Broadcast and reception
This episode was nominated for an Emmy Award in 2001 for "Outstanding Animated Program (For Programming Less Than One Hour)" but lost to The Simpsons episode "HOMR". In 2006, it was named by IGN as the best episode of Futurama, praising it because it is both "crude and hilarious". The episode was also noted as the "most hilarious" episode in Futurama's third season by Curve and in the book 5000 Episodes and No Commercials: The Ultimate Guide to TV Shows on DVD. In 2013, it was ranked number 10 "as voted on by fans" for Comedy Central's Futurama Fanarama marathon.

In its initial airing, the episode placed 79th in the Nielsen ratings for primetime shows for the week of January 29 - February 4, 2001.

Later reviews and critiques of the episode acknowledge the issues of dubious consent and unhealthy ideas about masculinity. In 2021, Jonah Schuhart of the Looper writes "much of the episode's humor crosses into borderline misogyny, and even makes light of sexual assault."  In 2023, Lewis Morton of the Avocado writes "the only people who undergo snu-snu are consenting enthusiastically, but then if you have to go out of your way to explain why something isn’t rape, you're probably already too far."

References

External links

Amazon Women in the Mood at The Infosphere.

Futurama (season 3) episodes
2001 American television episodes
Gender role reversal